Ilhami Çene (5 August 1909 – 10 July 1977) was a Turkish fencer. He competed in the team sabre events at the 1936 Summer Olympics.

References

External links
 

1909 births
1977 deaths
Turkish male sabre fencers
Olympic fencers of Turkey
Fencers at the 1936 Summer Olympics